The Governor of Sanaag is the chief executive of the Sanaag, leading the region's executive branch. 

Sanaag's territorial claims are disputed between Somaliland and Puntland, with some areas not clearly belonging to either of them. Therefore, neither the governor of Sanaag in Somaliland nor the governor of Sanaag in Puntland governs the entire Sanaag region.

Somalia

Somaliland

Governors of the regions in Somaliland is appointed to the office by the Somaliland president.

Puntland

See also

Sanaag
Politics of Somaliland

References

Sanaag
Governors of Somaliland
Governors of Sanaag